Callicopris is a monotypic moth genus in the family Xyloryctidae. Its only species, Callicopris cerograpta, is found on New Guinea. Both the genus and species were first described by Edward Meyrick in 1938.

References

Xyloryctidae
Monotypic moth genera
Taxa named by Edward Meyrick
Moths of Oceania
Xyloryctidae genera